Ozzfest Live is a compilation of live tracks taken from the first Ozzfest tour.  The tracks were recorded at two different Ozzfest dates on October 25–26, 1996.

Track listing
Coal Chamber - Loco   
Cellophane - Ride Thy Neighbor
Earth Crisis - Broken Foundation
Powerman 5000 - Organizized
Neurosis - Locust Star
Fear Factory - Replica
Biohazard - These Eyes
Sepultura - Attitude
Slayer - Angel of Death
Ozzy Osbourne - Perry Mason

References

1997 live albums
1997 compilation albums
Ozzfest